The learning circle is a mechanism for organizing and honoring the collective wisdom of a group.

History and overview
Learning circles are present in many indigenous cultures. For example, in some Native American cultures, councils of elders come together to understand problems in a spirit of shared community in "wisdom circles".

The term learning circle has been used to describe group efforts with clear links to social change. Over time and across countries, civic organizations, neighborhood communities, trade unions, churches and social justice groups have used the idea of learning circles to empower their members to make choices and take action. Groups have used the term study circle or learning circle to refer to a form of adult education. For example, Educators for Community Engagement, found that learning circles—with their principles of equal participation, reciprocity, and honoring of collective wisdom—embody the democratic principles of service-learning partnerships. They use learning circles, rather than more traditional forms of group meetings, to structure their annual conferences.

Primary teachers use a simple form of learning circles when they gather the students at the rug for "circle time". Many educators are using learning circles to connect students from around the world. Among the goals of this activity are helping students to develop trust and respect for diversity of experience, and fostering both listening and speaking skills among peers.

Researchers have used learning circles as a form of professional development to improve their practice. A similar term, quality circle, was used in the 1980s to characterize the successful practice in corporate settings in which the hierarchical boundaries between workers and managers are flattened to encourage participatory management and team leadership. Quality circles, originally associated with Japanese management and manufacturing techniques developed in Japan after World War II, were based on lectures of W. Edwards Deming (Joel & Ross, 1982). The goal was to encourage everyone to develop a strong sense of ownership over the process and products of the group.

Models
Learning circles have been used for centuries in many different situations. Two models are described here but others may exist.

OpenAgile learning circle

OpenAgile is an agile system of project and team management. In the OpenAgile system, the learning circle "is a simple and practical model of effective learning". The learning circle was adapted by Garry Bertieg from a development model in the "Building Momentum" document issued by the Baháʼí World Centre around 2003. The learning circle is one of OpenAgile's three foundations, alongside truthfulness and consultative decision-making.

This model describes learning as a series of four steps, four capacities for us to develop, and the pivotal importance of guidance.

Four steps

The four steps in the learning circle are reflection, learning, planning, and action, and are followed one after another, over and over. It is possible to begin an endeavour with any of the four steps.

 ReflectionThe reflection step is a pause in activities where people gather data, impressions, history, stories, and any other observations about what they have done. To do this effectively, they must develop and exercise the capacity for detachment from preconceived notions.
 LearningIn the learning step people carefully examine the observations made in the reflection step and "discover" new insights, skills, relationships, structures, failures or any other conceptual changes. They search for the principles involved in their work. To do this effectively, they must develop and exercise the capacity to search for the underlying principles.
 PlanningIn the planning step people apply the conceptual understandings they have developed. They use these newly discovered principles to systematically create a plan of action. Their planning should directly reflect each insight or principle they have learned. To do this step effectively, they must develop and exercise the capacity for love of learning.
 ActionIn the action step, as an individual, team, or organization people carry out the plans they have created. To do this effectively, they may need courage to plunge into the unknown.

Four capacities
Each of the four capacities in the learning circle are prerequisites for taking the next step. At the same time, as people exercise these capacities, they develop these capacities within themselves, in their teams and their organizations. Their inner conditions and capabilities have an effect on their environment which in turn then has an effect on them. By going through the learning circle, people use and develop these four capacities:

 DetachmentThe capacity for detachment supports the reflection step. Detachment is openness. Detachment means setting aside ego and objectively looking at the evidence including facts, events and feelings.
 SearchThe capacity for search supports the learning step. Search includes consultation, wisdom, discernment, judgement, and search for solutions.
 Love of learningThe capacity for love of the learning supports the planning step. Love creates openness to guidance. Love engenders vision, passion, and a sense of purpose.
 CourageThe capacity for courage supports the action step. Courage encompasses conscious choice, volition, willingness, and desire to act even in the face of uncertainty.
 GuidanceCentral to the effectiveness of the learning circle is guidance. Guidance is the act of assisting an individual, team, or organization to reach a destination by accompanying, giving directions, or supplying with them advice. Guidance plays a pivotal role in developing people's capacity and can be applied to all four steps and all four capacities. Guidance can come from within; a team member who has expertise can share it with the other team members. And Guidance can come from outside; people can bring experts into the organization, or can read information sources.

See also

 Dialogue
 Collaborative learning
 Community of inquiry
 Council circle
 Fishbowl (conversation)
 Learning community
 Literature circle
 Literature Circles in EFL
 Participatory action research
 Round Table in Arthurian legend
 
 T-groups
 World café (conversation)

References

Social groups
Types of organization
Group processes
Peer learning